This is a list of the extreme points of Denmark: the points that are farther north, south, east or west than any other location.

Latitude and longitude

Jutland Peninsula 
This includes only land on the Jutland peninsula – land that is part of mainland Europe:

 North : Skagen, North Jutland County
 South : Padborg, South Jutland County
 West : Blåvandshuk, Ribe County
 East : Grenå, Aarhus County
Following a flood in 1825, the northernmost part of Jutland is actually an island.

Denmark proper 
This includes only land in the European Union, also called Denmark proper, excluding Greenland and the Faroe Islands which are considered separate countries:

 North : Skagen, North Jutland County
 South : Gedser, Falster
 West : Blåvandshuk, Ribe County
 East : Østerskær, Christiansø

All territories 

Danish territory includes the island of Kaffeklubben, the northernmost permanent piece of land on earth. There are several temporary gravel banks marginally further north, such as Oodaaq, but these are not included here.

 North : Kaffeklubben Island, Greenland
 South : Gedser, Falster
 West : Cape Alexander, Greenland
 East : Østerskær, Christiansø

Gedser is also the southernmost point of Scandinavia and the Nordic countries.

Altitude 
 Maximum :
 Denmark proper : Møllehøj, 
 Minimum : Lammefjord,

See also 
 Extreme points of Europe
 Extreme points of Earth
 Geography of Denmark
 Extreme points of the Faroe Islands
 Geography of Greenland#Extreme points

References 

 
Denmark
Extreme